Abdelkader Ouaraghli (born 1943) is a Moroccan football goalkeeper who played for Morocco in the 1970 FIFA World Cup. He also played for Wydad Casablanca.

References

1943 births
Moroccan footballers
Morocco international footballers
Association football goalkeepers
Wydad AC players
Botola players
1970 FIFA World Cup players
Living people